Irmady Moodalakatte Jayarama Shetty (1 May 195115 May 2014) was a Member of Parliament who represented the Udupi Constituency of Karnataka in the 12th Lok Sabha. He was a member of the Bharatiya Janata Party.

Biography
Shetty was born to Sri Irmady Bhujanga Shetty (Father) and Smt. Moodalakatte Nagarathnamma Shetty (Mother). Shetty attained a Bachelor of Engineering Degree from Manipal Institute of Technology, Manipal. He also served as member of Karnataka Legislative Assembly from 1994 to 1998. He founded Moodlakatte Institute of Technology, Kundapura in the year 2004.

Political career
I.M Jayaram Shetty was MP of Udupi (Lok Sabha constituency) in the 12th Lok Sabha. He was an active member of the Bharatiya Janata Party (BJP) but later joined the Congress. He served as member of Karnataka Legislative Assembly from 1994 to 1998.

In 1994, he contested the Assembly elections for the first time from Byndoor on a BJP ticket and defeated G.S. Achar. In 1996, Jayaram Shetty contested the Lok Sabha elections from Udupi on a BJP ticket and defeated Oscar Fernandes from Congress.

He was defeated at the hands of Vinay Kumar Sorake of Congress in 1999. In 2004, he  moved over to JD (U) and then to Samajwadi Party, before joining the Congress.

Death
I M Jayaram Shetty died 15 May 2014, in a Bangalore hospital after a prolonged illness.

References

1951 births
2014 deaths
India MPs 1998–1999
People from Udupi
Bharatiya Janata Party politicians from Karnataka
Manipal Academy of Higher Education alumni
Kannada people
Lok Sabha members from Karnataka
Samajwadi Party politicians